Rimska cesta is the third studio album by Slovene musician Tomaž Pengov.

Track listing 
All songs written by Tomaž Pengov.
Side one
 "Na daljnem kolodvoru" – 3:31
 "Vandrovček" – 3:31
 "Generali" – 4:34
 "Kamor greš..." – 4:12
 "Bila sva vse" – 3:48
 "V nasmehu nekega dneva" – 4:12
 "Ladje konkvistadorjev" – 4:31
 "Stari klovni" – 3:45
 "Kam" – 2:27
 "Ostani lepa" – 3:16
 "Črna pega" – 3:02
 "Vrtna vrata" – 3:39
 "Obrazi padajo" – 2:33

Personnel 
 Tomaž Pengov - guitar, 12-string lute, vocal, producer
 Lado Jakša - photography, design
 Borut Činč - recorder

1992 albums
Tomaž Pengov albums